Seabra Foods is a privately held, family-owned U.S. supermarket chain based in Newark, New Jersey. Established in 1982, Seabra operates 16 locations in Rhode Island, Massachusetts, New Jersey and Florida.

Overview
Seabra Foods sells ethnic food products from Portugal, Brazil, Ecuador, Peru, Mexico, Spain and other countries.

History
Seabra Foods was founded in 1967 by Americo Nunes Seabra, an immigrant from Portugal. In 2018, the chain acquired two Lucky's Market locations, effectively entering the Southern Florida market.

References

External links
 Seabra Foods website

American companies established in 1982
Retail companies established in 1982
Companies based in Newark, New Jersey
Supermarkets of the United States
Family-owned companies of the United States
1982 establishments in New Jersey